Tiyaz or Tiyad was the sun god of the Palaians, regarded as the third most important deity in their pantheon. He was also incorporated into Hittite religion. He appears in a ritual written in Palaic, though presumed to belong to a Hittite corpus, in which he is implored to anoint the king. After the fall of the Hittite Empire, he might have been worshiped by Phrygians.

Name
Attested forms of the name of the Palaic sun god include Tiyaz and Tiyad. The spelling Tiwat, while present in some academic publications, is considered erroneous. It is presumed his name could also be represented by the Sumerogram dUTU, much like those of other solar deities mentioned in Hittite sources, such as Hurrian Šimige or Hattian Ištanu.

The theonym Tiyaz is derived from the Indo-European root diēu(-ot)-, "(heavenly) light", and is a cognate of Luwian Tiwaz. In Hittite the same root only formed the basis of the common words šiwat, "day", and šiuš, "god", while more distant cognate theonyms include Greek Zeus.

Character
Little is known about Tiyaz's individual character beyond his role as a sun god. He was a male deity, as in contrast with the Hittites, the Palaians did not adopt the Hattian solar goddesses. It has been noted that in contrast with Hittite religion, but similarly to Luwian religion, the traditions of the Palaians, while influenced by Hattians, preserved more elements presumed to have Indo-European origin.

Hittite sources indicate that Tiyaz was associated with a group of deities known as Ilaliyantikeš. Their name has been connected with the Hittite verb ilaliya-, "to desire". , a closely related group, were similarly associated with Luwian Tiwaz. 

In a Palaic myth about a lost god, Tiyaz dispatches an eagle to search for him.

Worship
Religion of the Palaians is only known from Hittite sources, which detail the celebrations pertaining to Palaic deities incorporated into the Hittite pantheon, who were worshiped in the temple of Ziparwa in Hattusa. Based on available evidence it has been proposed that Tiyaz was connected to rituals pertaining to kingship in Palaic culture. He is mentioned in a formula written in Palaic, though apparently reflecting  Hittite royal ideology. It forms a part of text CTH 751, a series of invocations to various deities. The sun god is invited to pick his favorite among the breads prepared as offerings. He is addressed as the father and mother of the king, which based on other similar examples is presumed to be a stock figure of speech indicating respect, rather than a statement about divine descent. He is implored to anoint and exalt the king. This is the only direct evidence for a Hittite belief in the rulers being directly nominated to their position by gods. 

It has been argued that the worship of Tiyaz persisted even after the absorption of remnants of the Palaians by Hittites and subsequent fall of the Hittite Empire. Its vestiges might be present in later religion of the Phrygians. Possible evidence includes the Old Phrygian personal name Tiyes and New Phrygian theonym Τιος. Other possible evidence for Palaic influence on beliefs of the Phrygians are the references to a local hypostasis of Zeus, Zeus Papas, argued to reflect the Palaic theonym Tarupapami ("Taru is my father", Taru being a weather god).

References

Bibliography

Hittite deities
Palaic mythology
Solar gods